Ivan Rabuzin (27 March 1921 – 18 December 2008) was a Croatian naïve artist. French art critic Anatole Jakovsky described him in 1972 as "one of the greatest naïve painters of all times and countries".

Rabuzin's father was a miner, and Ivan was the sixth of his eleven children. Ivan worked as a carpenter for many years, and did not begin painting until 1956, when he was thirty-five years old. He had little formal training as an artist, but his first solo exhibition in 1960 proved successful and he changed careers, becoming a professional painter in 1962. His 1963 exhibition in Galerie Mona Lisa in Paris marked the beginning of the rise of his international reputation.

Rabuzin's art is characterized by dense geometric patterns of vegetation and clouds that form rich, arabesque-like structures painted in gentle pastel colors. His motifs were described as an "idealistic reconstruction of the world". He took a stab at industrial design in the 1970s with a 500-piece run of the upscale Suomi tableware by Timo Sarpaneva that Rabuzin decorated for the German Rosenthal porcelain maker's Studio Linie.

Rabuzin was active in politics as a member of Croatian Democratic Union, and from 1993 to 1999 he was also a member of the Croatian Parliament (in the second and third assemblies).

Rabuzin stopped painting in 2002 due to an illness. He died on 18 December 2008 in a hospital in Varaždin, Croatia.

See also
 On the hills - virgin forest

References

External links
Rabuzin Fine Art - Rabuzin silkscreens and information source on the artist's life and Work
Ivan Rabuzin Gallery - Artist's homepage
Rabuzin oil paintings, Rabuzin serigraphs, Rabuzin prints
 http://fineartcritics.blogspot.com/2010/02/ivan-rabuzin-1921-2008.html
Raw Vision
Artnet.com
Galerie St. Etienne

1921 births
2008 deaths
People from Novi Marof
Croatian naïve painters
Representatives in the modern Croatian Parliament
Croatian Democratic Union politicians
20th-century Croatian painters
Croatian male painters
Yugoslav painters
20th-century Croatian male artists